Bouknadel (Berber: Buqnadel, ⴱⵓⵇⵏⴰⴷⴻⵍ, Arabic: بوقنادل) is a town on the Atlantic coast of Morocco situated slightly to the north of Rabat and south of Kenitra.
The locale is the site of a former U.S. Naval Radio Transmitter Communications Station (USNRST Bouknadel Morocco). The Naval Airstation was near the town of Kenitra, formerly known as Port Lyautey   Earliest permanent settlement of this area is evidenced at the Phoenician and Roman settlement of Chellah slightly to the south on the banks of the Oued Bou Regreg.

Tourism
Bouknadel became a prime tourism place for foreigners with the development of the beach front property and community developed by prestige the development includes beach front property's on the plage de nations, a PSG soccer training camp, a shopping center and more still in development. Bouknadel is also home to Morocco's arboretum the Exotiques De Bouknadel.

See also
Salé
Rabat
Casablanca
Morocco

References

External links
French web page

Populated places in Rabat-Salé-Kénitra